The People's Party for Freedom and Democracy (VVD) is a conservative-liberal political party in the Netherlands. The VVD, whose forerunner was the Freedom Party, is a party of the centre-right, which promotes private enterprise and economic liberalism.

Mark Rutte has been the party's leader since 31 May 2006 and on 14 October 2010 became Prime Minister of the Netherlands, marking the first time that the VVD led a government.

History

1948–1971
The VVD was founded in 1948 as a continuation of the Freedom Party, which was a continuation of the interbellum Liberal State Party, which in turn was a continuation of Liberal Union. They were joined by the Comité-Oud, a group of liberal members of the Labour Party (PvdA), led by Pieter Oud. The liberals within the Labour Party were primarily members of the pre-war social liberal Free-thinking Democratic League (VDB) who had gone on to join the Labour Party in the post-war Doorbraak ("Breakthrough") movement. However, they believed that the Labour Party was becoming too socialist for their liking. Oud became the merged party's first leader.

Between 1948 and 1952 the VVD took part in the broad cabinets led by the Labour Party Prime Minister Willem Drees. The party was a junior partner with only eight seats to the Catholic People's Party (KVP) and Labour Party, which both had around thirty seats (out of 100). The Drees cabinets laid the foundation for the welfare state and decolonisation of the Dutch East Indies. In the general election of 1952 the VVD gained one seat, but did not join the government. In the general election of 1956 it increased its total, receiving thirteen seats, but was still kept out of government until the general election of 1959, which was held early because of a cabinet crisis. This time it gained nineteen seats, and the party entered government alongside the Protestant Anti-Revolutionary Party (ARP), Christian Historical Union CHU and the Roman Catholic KVP.

In 1963, Oud retired from politics, and was succeeded by the Minister of the Interior Edzo Toxopeus. With Toxopeus as its Leader, the VVD lost three seats in the 1963 election, but remained in government. In 1962, a substantial group of disillusioned VVD members founded the Liberal Democratic Centre (Liberaal Democratisch Centrum, LDC) which was intended to introduce a more twentieth-century liberal direction pointing to the classical liberal VVD. In 1966, frustrated with their hopeless efforts, LDC members departed the VVD altogether and went on now to form an entirely political party, the Democrats 66 (D66).

In 1965, there also occurred a conflict between VVD Ministers and their counterparts from the KVP and ARP in the Marijnen cabinet. The cabinet fell, and without an election it was replaced by a KVP–ARP–PvdA cabinet under Jo Cals, which itself also fell the next year. In the following 1967 election the VVD remained relatively stable and entered yet again the cabinet under Prime Minister Piet de Jong.

During this period the VVD had loose ties with other liberal organisations, and together these formed the neutral pillar. They included the liberal papers Nieuwe Rotterdamsche Courant and Algemeen Handelsblad, the broadcaster AVRO and the employers' organisation VNO.

1971–1994

In the Dutch general election of 1971 the VVD lost one seat and the cabinet lost its majority. A cabinet was formed by the Christian democratic parties, the VVD and the Labour Party offshoot Democratic Socialists '70. This cabinet collapsed after a few months. Meanwhile, the charismatic young MP Hans Wiegel had attracted considerable attention. He became the new leader of the VVD: in 1971 he became the new parliamentary leader, and in 1972 he was appointed lijsttrekker. Under Wiegel's leadership, the party oriented towards a new political course, aiming to reform the welfare state and cut taxes. Wiegel did not shrink from conflict with the Labour Party and the trade unions. With this new course came a new electorate: working-class and middle-class voters who, because of individualisation and depillarisation, were more easy to attract.

The course proved to be profitable: in the heavily polarised general election of 1972 the VVD gained six seats. The VVD was kept out of government by the social democratic and Christian democratic cabinet led by Joop den Uyl. Although the ties between the VVD and other organisations within the neutral pillar became ever looser, the number of neutral organisations friendly to the VVD grew. The TROS and later Veronica, new broadcasters which entered the Netherlands Public Broadcasting, were friendly to the VVD. In 1977 the VVD again won six seats, bringing its total to twenty-eight seats. When lengthy formation talks between the social democrats and Christian democrats eventually led to a final break between the two parties, the VVD formed cabinet with the Christian Democratic Appeal (CDA), with a majority of only two seats.

In the general election of 1981 the VVD lost two seats and its partner the CDA lost even more. The cabinet was without a majority and a CDA, Labour and D66 cabinet was formed, falling after only a few months. In 1982 Hans Wiegel left Parliament to become Queen's Commissioner in Friesland and was succeeded by Ed Nijpels. In the general election of 1982 Nijpels' VVD gained ten seats, bringing its total up to 36. Once again, it formed a cabinet with the CDA under CDA Leader Ruud Lubbers. The cabinet began a programme of radical reform of the welfare state, which is still in place today. The VVD lost nine seats in the 1986 election but the cabinet nonetheless retained its majority. The losses were blamed on Nijpels, who stood down as leader of the VVD. He was succeeded by Joris Voorhoeve. In 1989 the CDA–VVD cabinet fell over a minor issue, and the VVD lost five seats in the subsequent election, leaving only twenty-two. The VVD was kept out of government, and Voorhoeve stood down and was succeeded by the charismatic intellectual Frits Bolkestein.

1994–present 

Bolkestein's VVD was one of the winners of the Dutch general election of 1994: the party gained nine seats. It formed an unprecedented government with the Labour Party (PvdA) and the social liberal Democrats 66. The so-called "purple cabinet" led by Wim Kok was the first Dutch government without any Christian parties since 1918. Like many of his predecessors, Bolkestein remained in parliament. His political style was characterised by some as "opposition to one's own government". This style was very successful and the VVD gained another seven seats in the 1998 election, becoming the second largest party in parliament with thirty-eight seats. The VVD formed a second Purple cabinet with the Labour Party and D66. Bolkestein left Dutch politics in 1999 to become European Commissioner. He was replaced by the more technocratic and social liberal Hans Dijkstal.

In the heavily polarised Dutch general election of 2002, dominated by the rise and murder of Pim Fortuyn, the VVD lost fourteen seats, leaving only twenty-four. The VVD nonetheless entered a cabinet with the Christian Democratic Appeal and the Pim Fortuyn List (LPF). Dijkstal stood down and was replaced by the popular former Minister of Finance Gerrit Zalm. After a few months, Zalm "pulled the plug" on the First Balkenende cabinet, after infighting between Pim Fortuyn List ministers Eduard Bomhoff and Herman Heinsbroek.

In the subsequent general election of 2003, the VVD with Gerrit Zalm as lijsttrekker gained four seats, making a total of twenty-eight. The party had expected to do much better, having adopted most of Fortuyn's proposals on immigration and integration. The VVD unwillingly entered the Second Balkenende cabinet with Zalm returning as Minister of Finance and as Deputy Prime Minister. On 2 September 2004, Geert Wilders, a Member of the House of Representatives, left the party after a dispute with Parliamentary leader Van Aartsen. He chose to continue as an Independent in the House of Representatives. On 27 November 2004 Gerrit Zalm was succeeded as Leader by the Parliamentary leader of the VVD in the House of Representatives Jozias van Aartsen.

In 2006 the party lost a considerable number of seats in the municipal elections, prompting parliamentary leader Jozias van Aartsen to step down. Willibrord van Beek was subsequently appointed parliamentary leader ad interim. In the subsequent party leadership run-off Mark Rutte was elected as the leader, defeating Rita Verdonk and Jelleke Veenendaal.

The general election of 2006 did not start off well for the VVD: Mark Rutte was criticised by his own parliamentary party for being invisible in the campaign, and he was unable to break the attention away from the duel between current Christian democratic Prime Minister Jan Peter Balkenende and Wouter Bos of the Labour Party. However, the VVD's campaign started relatively late. The election polls showed losses for the VVD; the former VVD deputy Prime Minister Hans Wiegel blamed a poor VVD campaign for this, caused by the heavily contested VVD leadership run-off between Mark Rutte and Rita Verdonk earlier in the year. Verdonk had her eyes on the deputy-minister post, while cabinet posts are normally decided upon by the political leader of the VVD. On election day, the party received enough votes for twenty-two seats, a loss of six seats. When the official election results were announced on Monday 27 November 2006, preferential votes became known as well, showing that Rita Verdonk, the second candidate on the list, had obtained more votes than the VVD's top candidate, Mark Rutte. Rutte had received 553,200 votes, while Verdonk had received 620,555. This led Verdonk to call for a party commission that would investigate the party leadership position, as a consequence of the situation of her obtaining more votes in the general election than Rutte, creating a short-lived crisis in the party. A crisis was averted when Rutte called for an ultimatum on his leadership, which Verdonk had to reconcile to, by rejecting her proposal for a party commission.
During 2007, signs of VVD infighting continued to play in the media. In June 2007, the former VVD minister Dekker presented a report on the previous election, showing that the VVD lacked clear leadership roles, however the report did not single out individuals for blame for the party's losses.

After Verdonk renewed her criticism of the party in September 2007, she was expelled from the parliamentary faction, and subsequently relinquished her membership of the party, after reconciliation attempts had proven futile. Verdonk started her own political movement, Proud of the Netherlands, subsequently. In opinion polls held after Verdonk's exit, the VVD was set to lose close to ten parliamentary seats in the next election.

Jan van Zanen, chairman of the VVD's party board, announced in November 2007 that he would step down in May 2008, a year before his term would end. The rest of the board also announced that they would step down. On the same day of his announcement, honorary member Hans Wiegel called for the resignation of the board, because it could not keep Verdonk in the party. Wiegel also opined that the VVD should become part of a larger liberal movement, that would encompass the social liberal Democrats 66, the Party for Freedom of Geert Wilders and Rita Verdonk's Proud of the Netherlands movement, although he found little resonance for this ideas from others.

In 2008, the VVD chose a new party chairman, Ivo Opstelten, the outgoing mayor of Rotterdam. Mark Rutte announced at the celebration of the party's sixth decennial that he would rewrite the foundational programme of the party that was enacted in the early 1980s, and offer the new principles for consideration by the party's members in the fall congress.

After the 2010 general election the VVD became the largest party with 31 seats and was the senior party in a centre-right minority First Rutte cabinet with the Christian Democratic Appeal supported by the Party for Freedom of Geert Wilders to obtain a majority. Rutte was sworn in as Prime Minister on 21 October 2010. Not only was it the first time that the VVD had led a government, but it was the first liberal-led government in 92 years. However, on 21 April 2012, after failed negotiations with the Party for Freedom on renewed budget cuts, the government became unstable and Mark Rutte deemed it likely that a new election would be held in 2012. On election day, 12 September 2012, the VVD remained the largest party in Parliament, winning 41 seats, a gain of 10 seats.

After the 2012 general election the VVD entered into a ruling coalition with the Labour Party as its junior coalition partner. This coalition lasted a full term, but lost its majority at the 2017 election; the VVD itself lost eight seats, though remained the largest party with 33. Rutte became Prime Minister again, forming a centre-right green cabinet with the Christian Democratic Appeal, Democrats 66 and the Christian Union. In March 2021, VVD was the winner of the general election, securing 34 out of 150 seats. Prime Minister Mark Rutte, in power since 2010, formed his fourth VVD-led coalition.

Etymology
The VVD was originally a merger of the Party of Freedom and Freethinking Democratic dissenters within the Labour Party. In this name, both tendencies, classical liberalism ("Freedom") and social liberalism ("People's Party"; "Democracy") are represented. Despite being a liberal party, the VVD did not openly call itself "liberal", mainly because of the for some still lingering negative connotations of liberalism developed during the Great Depression and World War II.

The most common English translation of the name is the literal translation, People's Party for Freedom and Democracy.

Ideology and policies
The VVD is described as conservative-liberal, liberal-conservative, and classical-liberal.

The VVD describes itself as a party founded on a liberal philosophy, traditionally being the most ardent supporter of 'free markets' of all Dutch political parties, promoting political, economic liberalism, classical liberalism, cultural liberalism, but also (in contrast to this) committed to the idea of the welfare state.

Post 1971, the party became more populist, although some conservative-liberal elements remain. The 2006 leadership election was interpreted by many as a conflict between a liberal group and a conservative group within the VVD, with the distinctly liberal Rutte beating conservative Verdonk. The results were, with 52% voting for Rutte and 46% for Verdonk.

Liberal Manifesto
The principles of the People's Party for Freedom and Democracy were outlined in the "Liberal Manifesto" (Liberaal Manifest) and latterly the election programmes. The Liberal Manifesto was a general outlook on the direction of the party would like to mirror itself and is an extension of the party's foundational principles. The election programmes are more oriented to practical politics, for example, winning the elections on-the-day and by any means possible. The last Liberal Manifesto of the VVD was published in September 2005. It developed a broad outline around the themes of democracy, security, freedom and citizenship, along with a vision of the future of party's internal structure. Below some of the points from the Manifesto are presented:

Democracy
 The Manifesto calls for a directly elected Prime Minister, whereby voters could express their preference on the ballot.
 The question of (advisory) referendums is not favourable.
 Mayors should be directly elected by the people.
 Commitment to the Four Freedoms of the European Single Market.

Security
 A common policy on defence and security in the European Union is called for.

Freedom
 The principle of non-discrimination should be given more importance than the exercise of religion.
 "Social rights" are to be continued. These are not simply rights, but they also create obligations.
 Euthanasia is part of a person's right to self-determination.
 Commitment to an open economy, with a "regulated free-market", including patents.
 Support for the freedom of contract. No right for workers to enter into nationally binding collective bargaining agreements.

Citizenship
 Minimise the option of dual citizenship.
 Social security should only be fully open for Dutch nationals. Migrants would have to integrate in order to become citizens.

Policy overview

 Economy and Finance 
 Small government
 Laissez-faire
 Tax reductions
 Market economy
 Balanced budget

 Government and Social Affairs 
 Deregulation
 Separation of church and state
 Minimise multiple citizenship
 Emancipation
 Same-sex marriage
 Cultural Assimilation
 Sober care of refugees

 Foreign policy and Law
 Pro-Europeanism
 Internationalism
 Multilateralism
 Mandatory sentencing
 Anti-squatting
 Distinction between soft drugs and hard drugs

 Health
 Universal health care
 Expansion of the euthanasia policy
Pro-choice

Electoral results

House of Representatives

Senate

European Parliament

Representation

Members of the Fourth Rutte cabinet

Members of the States General

Members of the House of Representatives

Members of the Senate

Representation in EU institutions 
Current members of the European Parliament since the European Parliamentary election of 2019:

In the European Parliament, VVD sits in the Renew Europe group with five MEPs.

In the European Committee of the Regions, VVD sits in the Renew Europe CoR Group, with one full and two alternate members for the 2020-2025 mandate. Martijn van Gruijthuijsen is Coordinator in the ECON Commission and Wilma Delissen-Van Tongerlo is Deputy Coordinator in the CIVEX Commission.

Municipal and provincial government

Provincial government 
The VVD provides three out of twelve King's Commissioners. The VVD is part of every college of the Provincial-Executives Gedeputeerde Staten except for Utrecht.

In the following figure one can see the election results of the provincial elections of 2003, 2007, 2011, 2015, and 2019 per province. It shows the areas where the VVD is strong, namely the Randstad urban area that consists out of the provinces of North and South Holland, Utrecht and (parts of) Flevoland, and also the provinces of North Brabant and Gelderland. The party is weak in northern peripheral provinces like Friesland, Groningen, and Overijssel, and also in southern peripheral provinces like Zeeland, and Limburg.

Municipal government 
119 of the 380 Dutch Mayors are member of the VVD since 2018. Furthermore, the party has about 250 aldermen and 1100 members of municipal councils. The VVD provides the mayors of several major cities.

Electorate 
Historically the VVD electorate consisted mainly of secular middle-class and upper-class voters, with a strong support from entrepreneurs. Under the leadership of Wiegel, the VVD started to expand its appeal to working class voters.

Organisation

Leadership 

 Leaders
 Pieter Oud (28 January 1948 – 16 May 1963)
 Edzo Toxopeus (16 May 1963 – 1 October 1969)
 Molly Geertsema (1 October 1969 – 1 July 1971)
 Hans Wiegel (1 July 1971 – 20 April 1982)
 Ed Nijpels (20 April 1982 – 9 July 1986)
 Rudolf de Korte (9 July 1986 – 15 December 1986)
 Joris Voorhoeve (15 December 1986 – 30 April 1990)
 Frits Bolkestein (30 April 1990 – 30 July 1998)
 Hans Dijkstal (30 July 1998 – 16 May 2002)
 Gerrit Zalm (16 May 2002 – 27 November 2004)
 Jozias van Aartsen (27 November 2004 – 8 March 2006)
 Vacant (8 March 2006 – 31 May 2006)
 Mark Rutte (since 31 May 2006)

 Chairs
 Dirk Stikker (24 January 1948 – 7 Augustus 1948)
 Vacant (7 August 1948 – 8 April 1949)
 Pieter Oud (8 April 1949 – 9 November 1963)
 Kornelis van der Pols (9 November 1963 – 29 March 1969)
 Haya van Someren (29 March 1969 – 15 March 1975)
 Frits Korthals Altes (15 March 1975 – 22 May 1981)
 Jan Kamminga (22 May 1981 – 29 November 1986)
 Leendert Ginjaar (29 November 1986 – 4 October 1991)
 Dian van Leeuwen-Schut (4 October 1991 – 27 May 1994)
 Willem Hoekzema (27 May 1994 – 28 May 1999)
 Bas Eenhoorn (28 May 1999 – 28 November 2003)
 Jan van Zanen (28 November 2003 – 23 May 2008)
 Ivo Opstelten (23 May 2008 – 14 October 2010)
 Vacant (14 October 2010 – 22 May 2011)
 Benk Korthals (22 May 2011 – 14 June 2014)
 Henry Keizer (14 June 2014 – 18 May 2017)
 Vacant (18 May 2017 – 25 November 2017)
 Christianne van der Wal (25 November 2017 – 10 January 2022)
 Onno Hoes (since 10 January 2022 – 7 October 2022) (Ad interim)
 Eric Wetzels (since 7 October 2022)

 Vice Chairmen
 Pieter Oud (28 January 1948 – 8 April 1949)
 Harm van Riel (8 April 1949 – 15 May 1963)
 Johan Witteveen (15 May 1963 – 24 July 1963)
 Hans Roelen (24 July 1963 – 16 July 1969)
 Henk Talsma (16 July 1969 – 1978)
 Hendrik Toxopeus (1978 – 1979)
 Jan Kamminga (1979 – 22 May 1981)
 Liesbeth Tuijnman (22 May 1981 – December 1985)
 Ivo Opstelten (February 1986 – 22 May 1993)
 Jan Gmelich Meijling (22 May 1993 – 22 Augustus 1994)
 Ronald Haafkens (22 Augustus 1994 – 28 May 1999)
 Sari van Heemskerck Pillis-Duvekot (28 May 1999 – 2004) (Co chair)
 Rudolf Sandberg tot Essenburg (28 May 1999 – 2000) (Co chair)
 Paul Tirion (2000 – 2001) (Co chair)
 Mark Harbers (2001 – 2005) (Co chair)
 Ines Adema (2004 – 4 April 2008) (Co chair)
 Rogier van der Sande (2005 – 4 April 2008) (Co chair)
 Mark Verheijen (4 April 2008 – 21 May 2012)
 Wiet de Bruijn (21 May 2012 – 14 June 2014) (Co chair)
 Robert Reibestein (21 May 2012 – 14 June 2014) (Co chair)
 Jeannette Baljeu (14 June 2014 – 20 May 2017)
 Eric Wetzels (20 May 2017 – 20 May 2020)
 Onno Hoes (since 20 May 2020)

 Parliamentary leaders in the Senate
 Anthonie Nicolaas Molenaar (24 January 1948 – 21 November 1958) (†)
 Harm van Riel (23 December 1958 – 3 June 1976)
 Haya van Someren (3 June 1976 – 12 November 1980) (†)
 Guus Zoutendijk (25 November 1980 – 23 June 1987)
 David Luteijn (23 June 1987 – 13 June 1995)
 Frits Korthals Altes (13 June 1995 – 11 March 1997)
 Leendert Ginjaar (11 March 1997 – 14 September 1999)
 Nicoline van den Broek (14 September 1999 – 1 May 2005)
 Uri Rosenthal (1 May 2005 – 14 October 2010)
 Fred de Graaf (14 October 2010 – 22 February 2011)
 Loek Hermans (22 February 2011 – 3 November 2015)
 Helmi Huijbregts-Schiedon (3 November 2015 – 24 November 2015)
 Annemarie Jorritsma (since 24 November 2015)

 Parliamentary leaders in the House of Representatives
 Pieter Oud (27 July 1948 – 16 May 1963)
 Roelof Zegering Hadders (16 May 1963 – 2 July 1963)
 Edzo Toxopeus (2 July 1963 – 24 July 1963)
 Molly Geertsema (24 July 1963 – 12 March 1966)
 Edzo Toxopeus (12 March 1966 – 1 October 1969)
 Molly Geertsema (1 October 1969 – 6 July 1971)
 Hans Wiegel (6 July 1971 – 19 December 1977)
 Koos Rietkerk (19 December 1977 – 25 Augustus 1981)
 Hans Wiegel (25 Augustus 1981 – 20 April 1982)
 Ed Nijpels (20 April 1982 – 9 July 1986)
 Joris Voorhoeve (9 July 1986 – 30 April 1990)
 Frits Bolkestein (30 April 1990 – 30 July 1998)
 Hans Dijkstal (30 July 1998 – 23 May 2002)
 Gerrit Zalm (23 May 2002 – 27 May 2003)
 Jozias van Aartsen (27 May 2003 – 8 March 2006)
 Willibrord van Beek (8 March 2006 – 29 June 2006)
 Mark Rutte (29 June 2006 – 8 October 2010)
 Stef Blok (8 October 2010 – 20 September 2012)
 Mark Rutte (20 September 2012 – 1 November 2012)
 Halbe Zijlstra (1 November 2012 – 23 March 2017)
 Mark Rutte  (23 March 2017 – 13 October 2017)
 Halbe Zijlstra (13 October 2017 – 25 October 2017)
 Klaas Dijkhoff (25 October 2017 – 31 March 2021)
 Mark Rutte (31 March 2021 – 10 January 2022)
 Sophie Hermans (since 10 January 2022)

 Lijsttrekker – General election
 Pieter Oud – 1948, 1952, 1956, 1959
 Edzo Toxopeus – 1963, 1967
 Molly Geertsema – 1971
 Hans Wiegel – 1972, 1977, 1981
 Ed Nijpels – 1982, 1986
 Joris Voorhoeve – 1989
 Frits Bolkenstein – 1994, 1998
 Hans Dijkstal – 2002
 Gerrit Zalm – 2003
 Mark Rutte – 2006, 2010, 2012, 2017, 2021

 Lijsttrekker – Senate election
 Guus Zoutendijk – 1983
 David Luteijn – 1987, 1991
 Frits Korthals Altes – 1995
 Nicoline van den Broek-Laman Trip – 1999, 2003
 Uri Rosenthal – 2007
 Loek Hermans – 2011, 2015
 Annemarie Jorritsma – 2019

Organisational structure 
The highest organ of the VVD is the General Assembly, in which all members present have a single vote. It convenes usually twice every year. It appoints the party board and decides on the party programme.

The order of the First Chamber, Second Chamber and European Parliament candidates list is decided by a referendum under all members voting by internet, phone or mail. If contested, the lijsttrekker of a candidates lists is appointed in a separate referendum in advance. Since 2002 the General Assembly can call for a referendum on other subjects too. The present chairman of the board was elected this way.

About 90 members elected by the members in meetings of the regional branches form the Party Council, which advises the Party Board in the months that the General Assembly does not convene. This is an important forum within the party. The party board handles the daily affairs of the party.

Linked organisations 
The independent youth organisation that has a partnership agreement with the VVD is the Youth Organisation Freedom and Democracy (Jongeren Organisatie Vrijheid en Democratie, JOVD), which is a member of the Liberal Youth Movement of the European Union and the International Federation of Liberal and Radical Youth.

The education institute of the VVD is the Haya van Someren Foundation. The Telders Foundation is the party's scientific institute and publishes the magazine Liberaal Reveil every two months. The party published the magazine Liber bi-monthly.

International organisations 
The VVD is a member of the Alliance of Liberals and Democrats for Europe Party and Liberal International.

Relationships to other parties 
The VVD has always been a very independent party. The VVD cooperates on the European and the international level with the social liberal Democraten 66. It has a long history of coalitions with the Christian Democratic Appeal and its Christian democratic predecessors, but was in government with the social democratic Labour Party from 1994 to 2002 and again between 2012 and 2017.

The VVD participates in the Netherlands Institute for Multiparty Democracy, a democracy assistance organisation of seven Dutch political parties.

See also 

Liberalism:
Contributions to liberal theory
Liberal democracy
Liberalism in the Netherlands
Liberalism worldwide

References

External links 

 
Documentation Centre Dutch Political Parties about VVD (in Dutch)

 
1948 establishments in the Netherlands
Pro-European political parties in the Netherlands
Conservative liberalism
Conservative liberal parties
Liberal International
Organisations based in The Hague